Androsace septentrionalis (pygmyflower rockjasmine, pygmy-flower rock-jasmine, northern rockjasmine, Northern fairy candelabra, Chinese: bei dian di mei) is a species of annual herbaceous plant in the Primrose family (Primulaceae), native to North America, Asia, and Europe.

Description
It is a small plant with a rosette of leaves and umbels of small white flowers held on multiple stems. It is parasitized by the oomycete species Peronospora agrorum.

Androsace septentrionalis subsp. subumbellata is a small plant with naked stems arising from a basal rosette of simple leaves.  The leaves are toothed and the stems terminate in an umbel of flowers. The very small flowers are five-cleft, and the sepals are persistent. The involucre bracts are linear. This subspecies is listed as threatened in Minnesota, where it has been recorded growing in sandy, xeric habitats, around ancient beach ridges and sand prairies.

References

septentrionalis
Alpine flora
Flora of Europe
Flora of North America
Flora of temperate Asia
Flora of Canada
Flora of Greenland
Flora of the Western United States
Plants described in 1753
Taxa named by Carl Linnaeus